Scaggs is a surname. Notable people with the surname include:

Austin Scaggs, American music critic
Boz Scaggs (born 1944), American singer, songwriter and guitarist
Noelle Scaggs (born 1979), American singer-songwriter

See also
Skaggs (disambiguation)